The Thomas E. Cavin House is a historic building located in Council Bluffs, Iowa.

History 
Built in 1887, it is an unusual and well-preserved brick example of an eclectic combination of Colonial Revival, Gothic Revival, and Queen Anne architectural elements. Cavin owned a dry goods store nearby. He lived here until he died in 1911, and the house remained in the family until 1919. At some point it had been converted into apartments. The house was damaged in a fire in 1934, and had to be partially rebuilt, especially the roof. The front porch is not original.

The house was individually listed on the National Register of Historic Places in 1984. In 2010 it was included as a contributing property in the Park/Glen Avenues Historic District.

References

Houses completed in 1887
Houses in Council Bluffs, Iowa
National Register of Historic Places in Pottawattamie County, Iowa
Houses on the National Register of Historic Places in Iowa
Colonial Revival architecture in Iowa
Gothic Revival architecture in Iowa
Queen Anne architecture in Iowa
Individually listed contributing properties to historic districts on the National Register in Iowa